Peru First, officially the Peru First Political Party, is a Peruvian political party. Founded in 2021, the party is led by Martín Vizcarra, former President of Peru from 2018 to 2020.

The party is currently undergoing its registration process at the National Jury of Elections in order to participate in the next general election.

References 

2021 establishments in Peru
Political parties established in 2021
Political parties in Peru